is a Japanese fashion model actor. He debuted as a model under the name Kee, but changed his name to "Kiyohiko Shibukawa" in 2006. He has appeared in more than 60 films since 1998.

Selected filmography

Film

Television

Awards

See also
Nan Goldin　-　He appeared on her work 'Tokyo Love'.

References

External links 

1974 births
Living people
Japanese male film actors
Japanese male models
Japanese male television actors
Actors from Gunma Prefecture
People from Shibukawa, Gunma
20th-century Japanese male actors
21st-century Japanese male actors